Harnad is a surname. Notable people with the surname include:

John Harnad, Hungarian mathematical physicist
Stevan Harnad (born 1945), Hungarian cognitive scientist